James Francis Weaver (born October 10, 1959) was an American former professional baseball outfielder for the Detroit Tigers, Seattle Mariners, and San Francisco Giants of Major League Baseball (MLB).

Weaver was born in Kingston, New York but moved to Holmes Beach, Florida with his parents in 1960. He attended Cardinal Mooney High School in Sarasota, Florida and played college baseball at Manatee Junior College.

References

External links

1959 births
Living people
American expatriate baseball players in Canada
Baseball players from New York (state)
Calgary Cannons players
Detroit Tigers players
Florida State Seminoles baseball players
Major League Baseball outfielders
Phoenix Firebirds players
Sportspeople from Kingston, New York
SCF Manatees baseball players
Toledo Mud Hens players
Tucson Toros players
Vancouver Canadians players
Visalia Oaks players
San Francisco Giants players
Seattle Mariners players
Orlando Twins players